Drunken Creek is a stream in eastern Bollinger County in the U.S. state of Missouri. It is a tributary of Hog Creek.

The stream headwaters arise adjacent to Missouri Route B about three miles northeast of Marble Hill. The stream flows south to south-southeast and crosses under Missouri Route 34 east of Marble Hill then turns southeast passing under Route U to its confluence with Hog Creek about 1.5 miles north of Laflin.

Drunken Creek most likely was so named on account of frequent flash flooding, although folk etymology maintains the creek was named for an incident when a man drowned in the creek while drunk.

See also
List of rivers of Missouri

References

Rivers of Bollinger County, Missouri
Rivers of Missouri